The Dimension Gate is the second studio album by Aurora Sutra, released in March 1994 by Talitha Records.

Reception
Aiding & Abetting called The Dimension Gate "oddly dissonant" and "unsettling, especially with the lush backgrounds provided." The critic went on to say "the strange sounds created are worth studying in detail." Industrial Reviews awarded the album four out of five stars and praised the vocal performances while comparing the band favorably to Thine Eyes and Dead Can Dance. Sonic Boom called the album "A unique concept" and said "the vocalist has a deep haunting, almost melodic voice, coupled tightly with the upbeat story telling music, makes for interesting listening."

Track listing

Personnel 
Adapted from The Dimension Gate liner notes.

Aurora Sutra
Patricia Nigiani – lead vocals
Peter Spilles – electronics, programming, vocals, production

Production and additional personnel
Aurora – design
André Menge – design
Matthias Rewig – engineering

Release history

References

External links 
 

1994 albums
Aurora Sutra albums
Cleopatra Records albums